Nicolas François Conroux, Baron de Pépinville (17 February 1770 – 11 November 1813) became a division commander during the Napoleonic Wars and was killed fighting the British in southern France. In 1786 he joined the French Royal Army and by 1792 he was an officer in an infantry regiment. During the French Revolutionary Wars he fought at First Arlon, Second Arlon, Fleurus, the 1796 campaign in southern Germany, Valvasone, and the 1798 invasion of Naples. In 1802 he was given command of an infantry regiment.

After leading his troops at Austerlitz in 1805, he was promoted to general officer. He led a brigade at Heilsberg, Friedland, Aspern-Essling, and Wagram. After being promoted again, he commanded a division in Spain at Fuentes de Onoro, Bornos, Vitoria, the Pyrenees, San Marcial, and the Bidassoa. He was fatally wounded at the Battle of Nivelle and died the following day. His surname is one of the Names inscribed under the Arc de Triomphe, on Column 16.

Footnotes

References

 

French generals
French military personnel of the French Revolutionary Wars
French military personnel killed in the Napoleonic Wars
French commanders of the Napoleonic Wars
People from Douai
1770 births
1813 deaths
Names inscribed under the Arc de Triomphe